Aargauer Kunsthaus (English: Aargauer Art House) a Swiss art museum founded in 1959, and located in Aarau. The museum collection includes Swiss art from the 18th-century to the present day; and Naturama, a natural history collection.

About 
Works in the museum art collection include Alberto Giacometti, Jean Tinguely, Richard Long, and Fischli/Weiss.

The original building was built between 1956 and 1959 by local architects Loepfe Hänni and Hänngli. In 2003, a new building extension was added to the museum. The architecture firm Herzog & de Meuron–designed the new building. 

Since 1 July 2020, art historian Katharina Ammann has served as the Director of Aargauer Kunsthaus.

See also 

 List of contemporary art museums
 Manor Cultural Prize

References

External links 

 Official website

Art museums and galleries in Switzerland
1959 establishments in Switzerland